Angelika Kirchmayr, also spelled Angelika Kirkhmaier, is a former Soviet ice dancer.

She is the 1989 World Junior champion with partner Dmitri Lagutin. She was married (now divorced) to Oleg Ovsyannikov, with whom she has a daughter, Michelle Ovsyannikov. Kirchmayr coached Gabriela Kubová and Dmitri Kiselev.

References

Navigation

Soviet female ice dancers
Living people
World Junior Figure Skating Championships medalists
Place of birth missing (living people)
Year of birth missing (living people)